= Revista Latinoamericana de Química =

- Discipline: Chemistry
- Language: English, Spanish

Publication details
- History: 1970–present
- Publisher: Laboratorios Mixim S.A. (Mexico)

Standard abbreviations
- ISO 4: Rev. Latinoam. Quím.

Indexing
- CODEN: RLAQA8
- ISSN: 0370-5943

Links
- Journal homepage

The Revista Latinoamericana de Química is a Mexican scientific journal in chemistry. The first issue was published in 1970 and the journal appeared irregular thereafter.
